George E. Beedle from Embarrass, Wisconsin was a member of the Wisconsin State Assembly. He died in USA at age 62 in January 1927

Biography

Career
Beedle was a member of the Assembly from 1903 to 1906. Additionally, he served as a member of the Waupaca County, Wisconsin Board of Supervisors and Insurance Commissioner of Wisconsin. He was a Republican.

References

External links
The Political Graveyard

1864 births
County supervisors in Wisconsin
Republican Party members of the Wisconsin State Assembly
People from Shawano, Wisconsin
People from Waupaca County, Wisconsin
Year of death missing